Henos Amorina is a former leader of the metalworkers of Osasco, a municipality and city in São Paulo, Brazil. He is a founding member of the Workers' Party of Brazil.

References

Further reading
Harnecker, Marta El sueño era posible: los orígenes del Partido de los Trabajadores de Brasil narrado por sus protagonistas. Cap V, #4: Henos Amorina: en la lucha desde los años sesenta. Madrid: Editorial Popular, 1993 (also here)

Living people
Workers' Party (Brazil) politicians
People from Osasco
Year of birth missing (living people)